Absolutely Seriously is a 1961 Soviet comedy anthology film directed by Eldar Ryazanov, Naum Trakhtenberg, Eduard Zmoiro, Vladimir Semakov and Leonid Gaidai.

Plot 
The film is a comedy almanac, which includes five short stories.

 Sergey Filippov as cameo, almanac presenter
 Pavel Tarasov as movie critic
 Pyotr Repnin as movie critic
 Igor Sretensky as screenwriter

How Robinson Was Created 
Anatoli Papanov as editor of magazine "Adventure Business"
 Sergey Filippov as writer Moldavantsev/Robinson Crusoe
Zinovy Gerdt as narrator (uncredited)

A Story with Pirozhki 
Rostislav Plyatt as customer
Georgy Georgiu as store manager
Boris Novikov as chief of department
Emma Treyvas as chief of section
Svetlana Kharitonova as cashier Tonechka
Rina Zelyonaya as lady in queue

Foreigners 
Vladimir Kulik as Zhora Volobuyev the stilyaga
Maria Mironova as Zhora's mother
Maria Kravchunovskaya as Zhora's grandmother
Aleksandr Belyavsky as "Frank" the journalist
Ilya Rutberg as Edik "Kosoi" the stilyaga
Tatiana Bestaeva as "Mary" the stilyaga

Bon Appetit 

 Serafim Anikeyev as visitor, the former waiter
 Marina Polbentseva as waiter
 Olga Viklandt as barmaid
 Nina Mager as young waiter
 Yelizaveta Nikishchikhina as café visitor (uncredited)
 Pavel Vinnik as cook (uncredited)
 Georgy Millyar as doorman (uncredited)

Dog Barbos and Unusual Cross 
Yevgeny Morgunov as Pro
 Yuri Nikulin as Fool
Georgy Vitsin as Coward
Dog Bryokh as Dog Barbos
Georgy Millyar as fishery supervision inspector in a boat

References

External links 
 
1961 comedy films
1961 films
Films scored by Aleksandr Zatsepin
Russian anthology films
Russian comedy films
1960s Russian-language films
Soviet comedy films